Odites holocitra is a moth in the family Depressariidae. It was described by Edward Meyrick in 1925. It is found in Cameroon.

The wingspan is about 31 mm. The forewings are pale lemon yellow and the hindwings are yellow whitish.

References

Moths described in 1925
Odites
Taxa named by Edward Meyrick